Kendriya Vidyalaya, Rajgarh  is a school in Rajgarh, Madhya Pradesh, which is part of Kendriya Vidyalaya Sangathan.

It was established in 1965 and administered through KVS Bhopal region which works under the direct guidance of Ministry of Human Resource and Development. The school is affiliated with the Central Board of Secondary Education.

A body known as the Kendriya Vidyalaya Sangathan (Central School Organization) oversees the functioning of this school. It operates from its headquarters situated in New Delhi.

15 December is celebrated as K.V.S. Foundation Day.

References

External links 
Kendriya Vidyalaya Sangathan
Kendriya Vidyalaya Rajgarh

Kendriya Vidyalayas
Rajgarh, Madhya Pradesh
Schools in Madhya Pradesh
1965 establishments in Madhya Pradesh
Educational institutions established in 1965